Hugh Peter Tizard  is an English professional rugby union player, who currently plays as a lock for Premiership Rugby side Saracens. He previously played for Harlequins.

Rugby career
Tizard began playing rugby from the age of seven at Guildfordians RFC, and joined the youth system at Harlequins when he was 16 years old. He made his senior debut in October 2019, aged 19, during the pool stage of the 2019–20 Premiership Rugby Cup, before spending the rest of the season on loan at RFU Championship side London Scottish. He became a regular player in the Harlequins first team over the course of the 2021–22 Premiership season.

Tizard has represented England at age-grade level, playing for the U20s. He featured in all four of the team's matches during the truncated 2020 Six Nations Under 20s Championship.

In January 2022, it was confirmed that Tizard had signed with Saracens ahead of the 2022–23 season. He explained that his decision was influenced by his ambition to play for England and his desire to play alongside British & Irish Lions international and World Rugby Player of the Year nominee Maro Itoje. Tizard made his competitive debut for the team against former club Harlequins in September 2022, playing the full 80 minutes of the match to help Saracens to a 30–27 win.

Personal life
Tizard grew up in Guildford, Surrey. He is a supporter of Premier League club Liverpool F.C.

References

2000 births
Living people
English rugby union players
Rugby union locks
Harlequin F.C. players
Saracens F.C. players